Hüsamettin Tut (born 1 January 1991) is a Turkish footballer who plays for Sakaryaspor. He made his Süper Lig debut on 31 August 2012.

References

External links
 
 
 
 

1991 births
People from Ulubey, Ordu
Living people
Turkish footballers
Turkey youth international footballers
Association football fullbacks
Association football defenders
Orduspor footballers
Tarsus Idman Yurdu footballers
Giresunspor footballers
Ankara Keçiörengücü S.K. footballers
Sakaryaspor footballers
Süper Lig players
TFF First League players
TFF Second League players